Wilmar Rubens Cabrera Sappa (born July 31, 1959, in Cerrillos, Uruguay) is a retired football striker from Uruguay, who was nicknamed "Toro". He obtained 26 caps for his national team, scoring six goals. Having made his debut on June 2, 1983, in a match against Paraguay (0-0) in Asunción.

He played club football for Nacional, Millonarios of Colombia, Valencia C.F. and Real Valladolid from Spain. Necaxa from Mexico and OGC Nice in France.

Later in his career he returned to Uruguay where he played for Huracán Buceo, Rampla Juniors and River Plate Montevideo

External links
  LFP Stats
  Profile
  Necaxa :: Temporada 1989-1990

1959 births
Living people
People from Canelones Department
Uruguayan footballers
Association football forwards
Uruguay international footballers
1983 Copa América players
1986 FIFA World Cup players
Club Nacional de Football players
Rampla Juniors players
Club Atlético River Plate (Montevideo) players
Millonarios F.C. players
Deportivo Mandiyú footballers
Valencia CF players
Sporting de Gijón players
OGC Nice players
Club Necaxa footballers
Uruguayan Primera División players
Categoría Primera A players
Ligue 1 players
La Liga players
Liga MX players
Uruguayan beach soccer players
Expatriate footballers in Spain
Expatriate footballers in France
Expatriate footballers in Mexico
Expatriate footballers in Colombia
Cerro Largo F.C. managers
Copa América-winning players
Uruguayan football managers
River Plate Montevideo managers
L.D.U. Loja managers
S.D. Quito managers
El Tanque Sisley managers